Javon Hagan (born February 22, 1997) is an American football safety who is currently a free agent. After playing college football at Ohio, he signed with the Buccaneers as an undrafted free agent in 2020.

Professional career

Tampa Bay Buccaneers
Hagan signed with the Tampa Bay Buccaneers as an undrafted free agent following the 2020 NFL Draft on May 4, 2020. He was waived during final roster cuts on September 5, 2020, and signed to the team's practice squad the next day. He was elevated to the active roster on January 16 and January 23, 2021, for the team's divisional playoff game and NFC Championship Game against the New Orleans Saints and Green Bay Packers, and reverted to the practice squad after each game. He re-signed with the Buccaneers on February 9, 2021.

On August 31, 2021, Hagan was waived by the Buccaneers.

Arizona Cardinals
On October 26, 2021, Hagan was signed to the Arizona Cardinals practice squad. He signed a reserve/future contract with the Cardinals on January 19, 2022. He was released on June 16, 2022.

References

External links
Tampa Bay Buccaneers bio
Ohio Bobcats football bio

1997 births
Living people
Players of American football from Jacksonville, Florida
American football safeties
Ohio Bobcats football players
Tampa Bay Buccaneers players
Arizona Cardinals players